Furo MTV was a Brazilian satiric newscast produced and originally broadcast by MTV Brasil from March 2, 2009 to September 26, 2013. The program was created by the writer Lilian Amarante and was originally hosted by the comedians Dani Calabresa and Bento Ribeiro. With the Dani Calabresa departure from MTV in 2012, it was eventually replaced with the entry of Bruno Sutter, Daniel Furlan and Paulinho Serra in the show cast.

The show follow the fake news shows format, used in shows like the Comedy Central's The Daily Show and in the Saturday Night Live'''s segment Weekend Update, which aims to tell the events of the day in a critical, acid, fun and humorous way. The show hosts also make jokes and imitations of programs and artists from other networks as well as with MTV Brasil shows.

 History 
The show was created with others MTV's new shows in March 2009, with a running time of 15 minutes. In the second year of the show, began to have more 15 minutes, totaling 30 minutes on air, with the presentation of the new segments.

The show follow the line of fake news shows, as the Saturday Night Live's Weekend Update and The Daily Show, has the objective of show the facts of the day so critically, acid, funny and humored. The comedians make jokes about the other television channels and your artists, also including MTV's shows and VJs. In July 2011, the show arrived at his 500th edition and had special content.

 The 500th edition 
On July 19, 2011, Furo MTV completed 500 new episodes, and to commemorate the date, was broadcast the Furo Repórter, a documentary narrated by comedian Guilherme Santana (imitating Sérgio Chapelin, the Globo Repórter's host), as showed when Dani met Bento. Was revealed the backstage of the show, with testimony of the screenwriters and director, beyond hosts routine.

The climate of commemoration was continued throughout the week. On July 20, the show was presented from behind to front, with the inversion in the ordination in the presentation and portions filmed and later showed backward. On the next day, was the Furo Awards, with the awards of the audience with the presentation of the singer Vinny.

 2012 season 
In the fourth season of the show had an attraction the new reporters Paulinho Serra and Tatá Werneck, winning a new set, weather segment, and international correspondents. In interview to the newspaper Super Notícia, the director Marcelo Botta said: "Dani and Bento increasingly mingled and funny are the ones motives to watch the show''".

Furo MTV em Londres
In the 2012 edition of Olympics, Dani Calabresa and Bento Ribeiro traveled to host the show direct from London, with the special participation of the comedian Marcelo Adnet.  With the trip of the main hosts, the show has become hosted temporarily by guests, as Nany People, Bruno Motta and Pitty.

Prêmio Jovem Brasileiro 
On November 1, during the "Prêmio Jovem Brasileiro" (Young Brazilian Award, adapted) ceremony, the show received the Young Journalists Award. Dani and Bento accepted the award and joked about the length of the solemnity on the following episode.

References

External links 
 
 
 

Brazilian comedy television series
2009 in Brazilian television
Portuguese-language television shows